YMCA Camp Letts is a , co-educational summer residence camp and conference center located on the Rhode River, south of Annapolis, Maryland that is run by the YMCA of Metropolitan Washington. The camp was founded in 1906.

Current operations
The Camp mainly serves youngsters from the Baltimore-Washington area with a staff that is normally a mix of international and American counselors.

Notes

Further reading

External links
 Camp Letts Website

Letts
1906 establishments in Maryland
Letts
Buildings and structures in Anne Arundel County, Maryland